Remo Sele (born 7 June 1948) is a Liechtenstein former sports shooter. He competed at the 1972 Summer Olympics and the 1984 Summer Olympics.

References

1948 births
Living people
Liechtenstein male sport shooters
Olympic shooters of Liechtenstein
Shooters at the 1972 Summer Olympics
Shooters at the 1984 Summer Olympics
Place of birth missing (living people)